There are three Armenian Catholicoi called Karekin:

Catholicoi of all Armenians
 Karekin I (1932–1999), Catholicos from 1994 to 1999 
 Karekin II (1951- ) Catholicos from 1999 - present

Catholicoi of Cilicia
 Karekin I (Cilicia) (1943–1952)
 Karekin II (Cilicia)  (1932–1999), Catholicos from 1983 to 1994), later Karekin I Catholicos of All Armenians (see above)